Caladenia gladiolata, commonly known as small bayonet spider orchid, smelly socks or simply bayonet orchid is a plant in the orchid family Orchidaceae and is endemic to South Australia. It is a ground orchid with a single hairy leaf and one or two yellowish or brownish flowers with red stripes and unusual tips on the sepals and petals.

Description
The sepals and petals have thick, flat, bayonet-shaped glandular tips  and curve downwards. It is yellowish-green with a red tip and there are usually a few short teeth along its edges. There are four crowded rows of club-shaped, reddish-black calli along the centre line of the labellum. Flowering occurs from July to October.

Taxonomy and naming
Caladenia gladiolata was first formally described by Richard Sanders Rogers in 1907 and the description was published in Transactions, proceedings and report, Royal Society of South Australia. The specific epithet (gladiolatus) is derived from the Latin word gladius meaning "a sword".

Distribution and habitat
The small bayonet spider orchid occurs in the Flinders Ranges, Northern Lofty and Southern Lofty botanical regions of South Australia where it grows in shrubby or grassy woodland and forest in well-drained soil. It is currently only known from three or four populations.

Conservation
Caladenia gladiolata is listed as  "endangered" under the Australian Government Environment Protection and Biodiversity Conservation Act 1999. The main threats to the species are weed invasion, grazing and lack of pollination.

References

gladiolata
Plants described in 1810
Endemic orchids of Australia
Orchids of South Australia